Jean-Michel Liade Gnonka (born July 20, 1980 in Ouagadougou) is a Burkinabé football player who last played for Thai club Krabi.

International career
Gnonka was part of the Burkinabé 2004 African Nations Cup team, who finished bottom of their group in the first round of competition, thus failing to secure qualification for the quarter-finals.

References

1980 births
Living people
Burkinabé footballers
Burkinabé expatriate footballers
Burkina Faso international footballers
1998 African Cup of Nations players
2000 African Cup of Nations players
2004 African Cup of Nations players
Expatriate footballers in Algeria
Étoile Filante de Ouagadougou players
Sportspeople from Ouagadougou
Paradou AC players
AS Khroub players
RC Kouba players
ASFA Yennenga players
Expatriate footballers in Thailand
Jean-Michel Liade Gnonka
Association football defenders
Burkinabé expatriate sportspeople in Thailand
21st-century Burkinabé people